Ibrahim Aslanli (born 1 December 1996) is an Azerbaijani footballer who plays as a defender for Shamakhi FK in the Azerbaijan Premier League.

Club career
On 5 November 2017, Aslanli made his debut in the Azerbaijan Premier League for Qarabağ match against Kapaz.

References

External links
 

1996 births
Living people
Association football defenders
Azerbaijani footballers
Azerbaijan Premier League players
Qarabağ FK players
Zira FK players
Sabail FK players
Shamakhi FK players